Ayyappanum Koshiyum is a 2020 Indian Malayalam-language action thriller film written and directed by Sachy. Produced by Ranjith and P. M. Sasidharan, the film stars Biju Menon and Prithviraj Sukumaran in titular roles. 

Ayyappanum Koshiyum was released on 7 February 2020, and was one of the highest grossing Malayalam films of 2020, earning ₹52 crore worldwide. It won 4 awards at the 68th National Film Awards, including the National Awards for Best Direction for Sachy, Best Supporting Actor for Biju Menon, Best Female Playback Singer for Nanjiyamma, and Best Stunt Choreography for Mafia Sasi, Supreme Sundar, and Rajasekhar.

A Telugu remake, Bheemla Nayak starring Pawan Kalyan and Rana Daggubati was released on 25 February 2022.

Plot
Koshy Kurien, an ex-Havildar in Indian Army is on the way to Ooty from Kattappana, with his driver Kumaran. Koshy is drunk and nearly passed out in the car's backseat with a case full of alcohol, bought from the military canteen. Instead of the common route via Coimbatore, they have opted to take the Attappadi hill route, which they did not know was an alcohol prohibited region. The car is stopped on a monthly traffic check, which is a combined police, forest and excise department work. On finding the alcohol in the car the excise officials manhandle Koshy. Koshy, irritated by this assaults the excise officer Faizal. On seeing this, SI Ayyapan Nair steps in and restrains Koshy. Koshy is taken to the local police station and FIR is filed on him in the online records system. Within minutes, the officers are startled to see the name of well-known political and media personalities on the contact list of Koshy's mobile phone. Koshy reveals himself as a rich and influential ex-havildar from the Indian army living in Kattappana and also the son of an influential person named Kurain John. 

Fussing over this and over consultation with his CI Satheesh Kumar, Ayyapan decides to go easy and reveals himself as a native of the area, and that he has only 3 years to retire. Koshy asks Ayyappan to let him return home for 5 days to spend Christmas and promises to return for any prison sentence, but Ayyappan refuses, stating that he has been booked under non-bailable sections and may not go home. Soon, Koshy fakes a meltdown and asks for some alcohol as he is an addict. Against his better instincts, Ayyappan pours him some from the confiscated stock with help of a lady constable Jessy. Koshy secretly records this on his phone. Koshy is remanded to 12 days in Palakkad sub-jail, where he is visited by his family. After 12 days, Koshy gets bail on the condition that he has to sign once every Monday and Thursday at Attapadi station. Upon his release, he uses the video footage to get Ayyappan and Jessy suspended for breaking prohibition. Ayyappan is arrested, and his police medals are revoked. The next day he is brought out on bail by Satheesh, who makes a compromise with Koshy's friend MLA George, that Koshy can sign for all future bail conditions at the same time, and end this melee, in return for not providing original video evidence at the enquiry against Ayyappan. 

After signing at the station, Koshy goes back on his word, and his lawyer submits the video proof at the enquiry. Ayyappan has no answers to the enquiry done by the DSP Cheriyan George and despite saving Jessy's job, he is sure that his job is lost. Koshy meets him outside the DSP office and boards the bus to Attapadi, seemingly to apologise to him, but due to ego, they both challenge one another and Koshy leaves in his car. Furious at this blatant act of pride, Ayyappan savagely beats a small-time crook Kuttamani (who was aiding Koshy), in front of Koshy and demolishes Mani's illegal building. Visibly horrified at Ayyappan raining down fury on Mani, Satheesh reveals to Koshy that 25 years ago, Ayyappan was a brutal communist leader, who had killed 43 men, as they were commissioned by the landlords to get rid of union workers during Kummatti festival at Mundoor. He was caught by MLA Master Chathan and made to join the police force, He had also turned very mild. He finds out that Ayyappan had a nickname during those days of crime Mundoor Maadan. Frustrated, Koshy goes to drink in Anaikatti. While returning to Attapadi, Kumaran is arrested and his car is impounded. Left without phone, purse and other options, Koshy starts to walk to Attapadi. 

Ayyappan picks him up on his bike and both taunt each other with death threats. Alighting from Ayyapan's bike, Koshy walks miles to Attapadi, where he is refused to lodge as per Ayyappan's instructions. Koshy's phone is illegally given to Ayyappan by a young constable. Ayyappan calls Kurain John and tells him that his son will be in grave danger soon. Hearing about this and concerned for his son's safety, Kurian John sends Koshy's cousins to aid him, and covertly sends professional assailants as a precaution for his son's safety. The next day, Koshy and Ayyapan fight inside the police station, where the CI breaks up the fight, who assigns two policemen to guard Koshy at all times, but those policemen inform Ayyapan about Koshy's goons and Ayyappan thrashes them. Kurain John uses his influence to get an arrest warrant for Ayyappan's wife Kannamma (and thus their toddler son) as she was affiliated with a Maoist organisation years ago. Koshy visits his home in Kattappana and asks Kurain John to stop interfering in their tussle. Koshy's wife Ruby reprimands both of them and asks Koshy to amicably end the issue at once. Koshy realises that the peace of mind of his family is more important than his ego and decides to end this issue peacefully. With the help of his postor cousin and lawyers, he frames a plan to save Ayyappan's job. 

While Koshy is away to help Ayyappan, the arrest warrant arrives and Ayyappan refuses to surrender Kannamma. This forces them to flee from Attapadi. Ayyappan drops her and his son to safety, but the police arrives and arrests her before Ayyappan. Since Koshy is not in Attapadi, Ayyappan goes to Koshy's house in Kattappana to find him. After a brief showdown with Kurian, Ayyappan heads back to Attapadi to confront Koshy. Koshy demolishes Ayyappan's house as revenge for the showdown at Kattappana, and Ayyappan burns down Koshy's car with gunpowder. Both of them refuse to lodge a complaint against one another and monitoring the tense situation, police protection is assigned to Koshy. Kurian follows Ayyappan to Attapadi and tells Koshy that he will kill Ayyappan within 24 hours. Koshy informs the police that Kurain John is in Attapadi and was the one who sent goons to kill Ayyappan earlier. Kurien is arrested and imprisoned. When Ayyapan finally challenges Koshy, Koshy suggests an alternative, to have the showdown in Anaikatti town, beyond the jurisdiction of Kerala Police. 

A face-off duel and after an epic showdown of exchanging blows, bear grips and tossing each other over a puddle of water ensues where Ayyappan gains the upper hand and locks Koshy in a fatal bear grip. Cheriyan George, Satheesh and the rest of the officers, who were clandestinely watching the fight intervene and pulls them apart. Satheesh tells Ayyappan that Koshy framed himself as an alcohol addict, and Ayyappan had then poured alcohol for a medical emergency to keep Koshy's blood alcohol level as required for proper functioning. This has resulted in all charges against Ayyappan being dropped and him being reinstated into the police force and also the IG cancelled Kannamma's arrest and will be released the next day. Ayyapan is brought to the police station and is imprisoned for a day, till the rejoining order arrives. A year later, Ayyappan is transferred upon his request to Kattappana, after which he visits Koshy and shakes hands with him.

Cast

Production

Development
Ayyappanum Koshiyum is the second directorial of writer-turned-director Sachy after Anarkali (2015) which also had Prithviraj Sukumaran and Biju Menon in the main roles. Written by Sachy himself, the film was produced by the film director and Sachy's long-term friend Ranjith along with P. M. Sasidharan under the production company Gold Coin Motion Picture Company. The film's idea was first formed as a story about the relationship between Koshy and his driver, Sachy had two real-life friends resembling them, a jewellery owner and his driver. Later, police sub-inspector was introduced into the plot, which took the story into its present form. Prithviraj played the lead role and Menon had a supporting role in their last collaboration, Anarkali. The film was titled Ayyappanum Koshiyum as Sachy wanted to state that both Prithviraj and Menon have equal importance in the story. Sachy did not have anyone in mind for the two lead roles while screenwriting. Their casting was done after finishing the screenplay.

Filming
Principal photography began in early October 2019 in Attappadi, Palakkad district. It was completed in early December 2019. Menon suffered burn injuries on hands and legs while filming in November.

Music

The songs featured in the film and background score were composed by Jakes Bejoy, while the lyrics have been penned by B. K. Harinarayanan, Rafeeq Ahmed, and Nanjiyamma. The soundtrack album was released on 10 February 2020 by Manorama Music.

Release 
Ayyappanum Koshiyum was released on 7 February 2020. The film's satellite and digital rights are sold to Amazon Prime Video and Surya TV.

Reception

Critical reception
The film received positive reviews from critics with praise for performances (particularly Prithviraj Sukumaran and Biju Menon), story, direction, dialogues, cinematography and its tradition to Kerala culture.

The New Indian Express wrote: "This is essentially a masterclass by Sachy on how to make a three-hour film by relying mostly on dialogues which carry enough power to not just reverberate through the walls of the movie hall but also each cell and nerve in your body. With a script like this, one doesn't need bullets or pyrotechnics to excite the audience. Sachy does that with his characters, a rare skill that not many filmmakers possess today in Malayalam cinema", and praised the performances. The Hindu wrote: "It is a dialogue-driven narrative, as much verbal as visual, but without over-punctuation or the burden of forced hilarity. The film also comes with a highly textured screenplay, creating an immaculate balance between lightness and intensity", and the cast gives a stand-out performance, also it is "nearly three hours of riveting reel time devoid of any customary gimmicks". 

Baradwaj Rangan of Film Companion South wrote "...psychological flourishes make Ayyappanum Koshiyum a very different kind of masala movie about similar-yet-different, different-yet-similar men...as the film progresses, it becomes a very textured thing, with a bubbling undercurrent that keeps questioning a very specific kind of masculinity". The Times of India said that it is "a commercial film that reflects contemporary socio-political situations aptly" and Sachy "smartly scripts a story" that explains the struggles between an honest police officer and a rich spoiled brat, "the director manages to hold the audience in that compelling mood from start to finish" and "apart from a carefully written script with interesting characterisation, the casting is a bonus". According to The News Minute, "Prithviraj and Biju Menon spar in an engaging film ... the movie keeps you engaged for nearly all the three hours with no dramatic twists or turns or characters turning a new leaf overnight".

Box office
In the overseas opening weekend, it grossed US$36,253 (₹25.88 lakh) from 27 screens in the United States, US$3,562 (₹2.55 lakh) from 7 screens in Canada, and A$24,227 (₹11.65 lakh) from 7 screens in Australia. It grossed US$87,791 (₹65.03 lakh) in United States in five weeks, A$47,689 (₹23.04 lakh) in Australia in four weeks, NZ$28,012 (₹12.71 lakh) in New Zealand in three weeks, US$22,400 (₹16.17 lakh) in Canada in three weeks, and £48,267 (₹44.74 lakh) in two weeks. In its lifetime, Ayyappanum Koshiyum grossed ₹520 million at the global box office.

Accolades

Notes

References

External links
 

2020s Malayalam-language films
Indian action drama films
Films scored by Jakes Bejoy
Fictional portrayals of the Kerala Police
Films shot in Palakkad
Films about veterans
2020 films
2020 action drama films
Malayalam films remade in other languages